Jewish aristocracy may refer to:

 Patriarchal age
 Kohen
 Kings of Israel and Judah
 List of Jewish leaders in the Land of Israel
 Kings of Judah
 List of European Jewish nobility

See also 
 Solomon's Temple